İkiztepe is an archaeological excavation site at Bafra, Turkey in the Kızılırmak delta, near the Black Sea coast.

Although İkiztepe means "twin mounds" in Turkish, the site contains four mounds and a burial ground amidst those. İkiztepe II mound contains the earliest findings. Most of the findings are dated to the Early Bronze Age, but the earliest finds date back to possibly the sixth millennium BCE. Finds from İkiztepe exhibit similarities to material of the same age found elsewhere in Anatolia. There are also parallels with findings from Eastern Europe. Among the artifacts found are pottery, metalworks and spindle whorls. According to one theory, the Bosphorus might have been blocked temporarily during the Late Chalcolithic to Early Bronze Ages, exposing a wider shoreline at the coast of the Black Sea, making it possible to easily travel from Varna to İkiztepe region. 

The Hittite city of Zalpuwa is sometimes associated with İkiztepe. However, this identification is not certain.

The large amount of textile materials (spindle whorls) found in the site may indicate sailing activity.

The excavations in İkiztepe started in 1974 and continued intermittently into the 21st century.

References

Archaeological sites of prehistoric Anatolia
Samsun Province